The Bowlus Mill House is a historic home and farm complex, located at Spoolsville, Frederick County, Maryland, United States. It consists of the house built of narrow courses of flat cut stones, a frame bank barn on a stone foundation, and a small frame shed. The -story house with an exposed basement was built about 1800, and reflects the Germanic influence typical of the region in the period.

The Bowlus Mill House was listed on the National Register of Historic Places in 1996.

References

External links
, including photo from 2004, at Maryland Historical Trust

German-American culture in Maryland
Houses in Frederick County, Maryland
Houses on the National Register of Historic Places in Maryland
Federal architecture in Maryland
National Register of Historic Places in Frederick County, Maryland